Laura Lacole (born 12 September 1989) is a Northern Irish model.

In 2017, Lacole, an atheist, became the first woman in Northern Ireland to be married in a legal humanist ceremony, marrying Irish footballer Eunan O'Kane. The couple brought a judicial review to regarding Northern Ireland's treatment of humanists, which they viewed as discriminatory.

Early career
Lacole was born in Belfast, Northern Ireland. Her first modelling job was for a racing championship, during which she was published in motorsport magazines, including Modified Motors and Fast Car. She then modelled in Europe for racing events. At the age of 18, she worked at Paris Tuning Show and Circuit de Nevers Magny-Cours in France as a performer.

Glamour modelling
Her modelling progressed to glamour in 2008 at the age of 19. Lacole has been published in magazines and newspapers across the world. She has featured in the Irish and UK press.<

She won the title of Beach Babe 2011 in September of that year.

Media appearances
Since early 2012, Lacole has been broadcast on the BBC, SKY NEWS and UTV. Throughout 2012 and 2013, she was a regular contributor for broadcaster Stephen Nolan's TV and radio shows. In March 2013, she spoke with broadcaster Mark Forrest on whether women should trade on looks.

In September 2012, she spoke to BBC Newsnight about the 'No More Page 3' campaign, supporting the Page 3 girls. In January 2015, Lacole was a guest alongside former Home Secretary; Alan Johnson, Green Party MP Caroline Lucas and former Conservative Party MP Michael Portillo on BBC One's 'This Week' programme presented by Andrew Neil where she also spoke about the topic.

Space
In 2013, Lacole campaigned to go to space by competing in the Lynx Space Academy competition.

Charity
In 2010 and 2011, Lacole led the Ancestors Charity Bike Rally which delivers donated toys to children in the Ulster Hospital every Christmas.
In 2012, she became the Northern Ireland Ambassador for the 'Male Cancer Awareness Campaign' charity and in early 2013, did her own fundraising event the 'Belfast Strut'; a 16-mile walk with 200 participants.
In the lead up to this event, Lacole gained the support of William and Michael Dunlop who posed with her wearing only their helmets and boots to raise awareness of the event and its cause.

References

External links 
Laura Lacole's Official Website

1989 births
Living people
Female models from Belfast
Atheists from Northern Ireland
British humanists